Arms Academy was a public school located in Shelburne, Massachusetts, United States.

Named after Major Ira Arms, construction commenced following a gift of land and $20,000.  Initially dedicated as a private school in 1880, Shelburne voters made it a public school in 1894.  The final class graduated in 1967, prior to the establishment of nearby Mohawk Trail Regional High School.

Today, the building houses the Shelburne Historical Society.

References

Educational institutions established in 1884
Public high schools in Massachusetts
Schools in Franklin County, Massachusetts
1884 establishments in Massachusetts
Defunct schools in Massachusetts